BC Nový Jičín is a basketball team based in Nový Jičín that plays in the top professional Czech basketball league, the NBL. The team also used to go by the name Mlékárna Kunín, winning the National Basketball League under that name in 1998–99.

In the 2009–10 season, the club won the Central European Basketball League (CEBL).

Name through history

Notable players

 Emmanuel Ubilla 1 season: 2008–09

External links
Official homepage 

Basketball teams in the Czech Republic